"She Wolf (Falling to Pieces)" is a song by French DJ and music producer David Guetta, featuring vocals from Australian singer Sia. It was released as the lead single from the re-release of Nothing But the Beat, Nothing But the Beat 2.0 and tallies as the album's eighth single overall. It was released via digital download on August 21, 2012.

Background
Prior to its official release on August 21, 2012, an EP of remixes of the track, featuring contributions from Michael Calingham and Sandro Silva, was made available for a short time exclusively via Beatport, on August 7, 2012. The official release then followed on August 21, 2012, before the track was issued in the form of CD single and 12" vinyl in Germany on August 24, 2012. The single was released in the United Kingdom on September 10, 2012, on the date of the album's release. It peaked at #8 on the UK Singles Chart. Although this song failed to chart the US Billboard Hot 100, it topped the Billboard Hot Dance Club Songs chart, making it Guetta's seventh number-one on the chart.

Music video

Background
On September 21, 2012, a lyric video for the track was uploaded to Guetta's official VEVO channel. On September 26, 2012, a trailer for the music video was released, with an official premiere date of October 3, 2012, revealed. The official video for the track was uploaded to Guetta's official VEVO channel five days earlier on September 28, 2012.

Synopsis

The video starts off with a shot of a naked woman, which moves on to a wounded wolf running from a handful of human hunters. It is shown that the wolf is supernatural, as it is able to make the hunters "explode" on every breakdown of the song. The "explosions" depict the hunters and the landscape as composed by tiny polygons, as if everything were part of a computer simulated reality. At the end of the music video, the canine then transforms back into the naked woman at the start.

Location
The video was shot on-location in Iceland, at Langjökull, and at Reykjanes, in Krýsuvík and near Reykjanesviti.

Critical reception
Robert Copsey of Digital Spy gave the song a mixed review stating:

After a global conquering hook-up with Flo Rida she's returned to where it all began with David Guetta, who'll be hoping that lightning strikes twice after the spectacular and chart-topping 'Titanium'. Once again, it's the heartfelt lyrics that shine over the handbag house as she confesses: "You hunted me down like a wolf, a predator/ ...I felt like a deer in your lights" with the same inimitable gusto. The result is nothing we haven't heard already, but that's not necessarily a bad thing.

Track listing

Charts and certifications

Weekly charts

Year-end charts

Certifications

Release history

See also
 List of number-one dance singles of 2012 (U.S.)

References

2012 singles
David Guetta songs
Sia (musician) songs
Songs written by David Guetta
Songs written by Sia (musician)
Songs written by Chris Braide
Number-one singles in Hungary
Songs written by Giorgio Tuinfort
Song recordings produced by Chris Braide
2012 songs
Virgin Records singles
Song recordings produced by David Guetta
Music videos shot in Iceland